Jacundá River may refer to:

Brazil
 Jacundá River (Pará)
 Jacundá River (Rondônia), see Jacundá National Forest

See also
 Jamundá River, Brazil